Dragonheart: A New Beginning is a 2000 fantasy action-adventure drama film directed by Doug Lefler, starring Robby Benson, Christopher Masterson, Harry Van Gorkum, and Rona Figueroa. The film is a direct-to-video sequel to the 1996 film Dragonheart.

Plot
A year before his death, Sir Bowen visits the cave of his long-dead dragon friend Draco and finds an egg. He entrusts it to the monastery of his friend Brother Gilbert. Aware of a prophecy stating "a dragon's heart could doom mankind when a two-tailed comet blazed across the night sky", the friars pledge to hide the dragon until the comet passes, with Friar Peter protecting and teaching him for 20 years. The dragon's care soon falls upon a young and grumpy monk named Mansel.

Geoff, an orphaned stable boy who dreams of becoming a knight like Bowen, lives at the monastery doing menial chores. Meanwhile, the king makes a man named Osric his chief adviser. Osric pledges to ensure the Old Code continues but secretly corrupts it while poisoning the king, plotting to take the throne. Two Chinese citizens from the Hebei Province: Master Kwan and his son, enter the kingdom and ask Friar Peter if he knows anything about dragons. According to the stars, a new dragon was born, and the comet arrives in eight days; they want to prevent the prophecy and confirm if the dragon has a pure heart. Geoff tricks Mansel into doing manual labor and finds the hidden dragon, Drake. Geoff is initially afraid but realizes Drake is equally scared, and they become fast friends. Friar Peter dies suddenly the following day, and Drake goes outside for the first time.

Four days before the comet, the two Chinese learn of Drake's existence. Some knights surprise Geoff, and he discovers the Chinese son is Lian, China's empress in disguise. The knights threaten Geoff, forcing Drake to take his first flight to rescue him, revealing himself to the kingdom. Osric names Geoff and Drake as the kingdom's protectors against the invading Teregoths and takes Geoff under his wing. After testing Drake's purity, Master Kwan begins teaching him to use his dragon abilities, including exhaling ice breath, a rare skill that few dragons master. Lian reveals to Geoff that a rogue dragon, Griffin, betrayed the dragon's honor code and led a rebellion until virtuous dragons captured him and took his heart, placing it in an amulet. Fearing that all dragons were like Griffin, the Chinese emperor Kuo-fan ordered all Eastern dragons killed, so Drake is now the world's last dragon.

On the prophesied day, Kwan and Lian are captured and jailed. Osric takes Geoff and Drake to battle a group of Teregoths at a border house. Osric fakes a fatal blow and asks Drake to give him half his heart, but Geoff realizes the deception and stops Drake. Osric tries holding Geoff hostage but fails. Drake rallies an escape and masters firebreathing to save Geoff. Kwan, Lian, and Mansel escape the castle dungeon, heal the king, and confront Osric, who recognizes Lian and the amulet. Kwan discerns Osric's true identity and orders the amulet burned. Osric recovers and throws a knife at Lian to punish her for her ancestor's sins, but Kwan intervenes and dies.

Geoff and Drake arrive as Osric claims to have exposed the Old Code's true meaning as a way to control the weak. Osric reveals one dragon escaped Bowen's wrath, fled to the East, and sought revenge before the noble dragons stopped him and cursed him to live as a human as punishment. He cuts his chest open with Lian's knife and takes the heart as the comet appears, revealing himself as Griffin and making Lian realize the prophecy was about him. Resuming his dragon form, Griffin asks Drake to join him in humanity's conquest. Recalling how Griffin would've cost him his soul hadn't Geoff intervened, Drake refuses and challenges Griffin. After a short but fierce fight between the dragons, Drake masters ice breath and freezes Griffin to death; Griffin falls and shatters before the comet passes. An ice shard stabs and kills Geoff, so Drake offers part of his heart, reviving Geoff. The Old Code is restored; Lian returns to her royal duties for a time; and Mansel is awarded guardianship of Brother Gilbert's scrolls, finally gaining the desired life of prayer and devotion. Geoff and Drake become brothers, finally getting the family they both wanted.

Cast
 Christopher Masterson as Geoffrey (credited as Chris Masterson)
 Robby Benson as Drake (voice)
 Harry Van Gorkum as Old Bowen / Lord Osric of Crosley / Griffin (voice)
 Rona Figueroa as Lian
 Henry O as Master Kwan
 Matt Hickey as Novice Monk Mansel
 Anthony O'Donnell as Older Mansel (voice)
 John Woodnutt as Friar Peter
 Ken Shorter as The King
 Tom Burke as Roland
 Lubomir Misak as Lubo
 Karin Haydu as King's Attendant
 Peter Hric as Sir Stefan, Osric's Henchman
 Imrich Strunar as Miller
 Gustáv Kyselica as Cowherd
 Vladimir Oktavec as Abbott
 Vlado Durdík as Old Man
 Stano Satko as Squire
 Roman Jankovic as Squire
 Peter Olgyay as Squire
 Vladimir 'Furdo' Furdik as Sentry (credited as Vladimir Furdik)

Production

Music 

Mark McKenzie composed the score with orchestrations done by him, Patrick Russ, and Warren Sherk. At producer De Laurentiis's request, McKenzie incorporated Randy Edelman's Dragonheart theme from the first film in some tracks; using it as a guideline, McKenzie wrote themes that would easily transition with it.

Reception
The film-critic aggregator Rotten Tomatoes reports 40% positive reviews, based on five critics.

Accolades

Prequels
A third Dragonheart was in development since June 2014. Dragonheart 3: The Sorcerer's Curse is a prequel taking place years before the 1996 film, focusing on the idea of the dragon race being rejuvenated from its brink-of-extinction state. The film was released as a direct-to-DVD/Blu-ray format in February 2015 in North America. Raffaella De Laurentiis was chosen to be the producer, with Colin Teague as the director. The second and third prequels, Dragonheart: Battle for the Heartfire and Dragonheart: Vengeance, were released in 2017 and 2020, respectively.

References

External links
 

2000 films
2000 fantasy films
British direct-to-video films
Direct-to-video sequel films
Arthurian films
Direct-to-video fantasy films
English-language Slovak films
Slovak fantasy films
Universal Pictures direct-to-video films
Dragonheart films
Films about dragons
Films shot in Slovakia
Films produced by Raffaella De Laurentiis
Films directed by Doug Lefler
2000s English-language films
American direct-to-video films
American fantasy drama films
American action adventure films
British fantasy drama films
British action adventure films
2000s American films
2000s British films